Allocasuarina robusta is a species of the genus Allocasuarina native to Australia.

References

External links
  Occurrence data for Allocasuarina robusta from The Australasian Virtual Herbarium

robusta
Fagales of Australia
Flora of South Australia